Yeshivat Kerem B'Yavneh, a village in Israel often abbreviated as KBY
Kebayoran railway station, station code KBY
Streaky Bay Airport, IATA airport code "KBY"